David L. Tulloch is an associate professor of Landscape Architecture at Rutgers University. He is known for his research and involvement with PPGIS and Institutional GIS.  Dr. Tulloch maintains the high-profile blog, Places and Spaces  He is not related to Bitsie Tulloch.

Notes

University of Wisconsin–Madison alumni
American landscape architects
Living people
Year of birth missing (living people)